Chak 15 DNB  (is a village of Bahawalpur. It was founded after independence of Pakistan.

Location
This village is located on the belt road from Adda 13000 to Khanqah Sharif, which
is closer to the road. This village is also capital village by area vise in the area. It is located
about 4 km from Adda Tairaan Hazaar on the belt road of Khankah Sharif. Chak 15 DNB is 39 km from Bahawalpur city, a city known for palaces and the city of Bahawalpur is also famous for the kings that lived there

Villages in Bahawalpur District